Akinyele Adams, better known by the mononym Akinyele, is an American rapper known for his sexually explicit lyrics, including his 1996 underground radio hit "Put It in Your Mouth". He appeared on "Live at the Barbeque" off of Main Source's 1991 album Breaking Atoms. His first album, Vagina Diner, was released in 1993. In 2001, he released Anakonda.

He is also listed as the composer for Swizz Beatz's 2007 singles "Money in the Bank" and "One Man Band Man".

Since 2010, Akinyele has retired from the rap circuit, and instead opened up the club, V-Live, in 2016 in Miami Beach. Since opening, it has garnered controversy for teetering on being a strip club, which is prohibited in Miami Beach, and for having overly loud music which disturbed the residents living in the area. Due to these and other mounting issues, V-Live was forced to close down in 2019.

He is of Nigerian and Costa Rican descent.

Discography 
Studio albums
 Vagina Diner (1993)
 Aktapuss (1999)
 Anakonda (2001)

Compilation albums
 Live at the Barbecue: Unreleased Hits (2004)

EPs
 Put It in Your Mouth (1996)

Singles
 "Ak Ha Ha! Ak Hoo Hoo?" (1993)
 "The Bomb" (1993)
 "Put It in Your Mouth" (1996)
 "Take a Lick" (1999)
 "Do You Wanna?" (2001)

References

External links 
 
 

African-American male rappers
Hispanic and Latino American rappers
American people of Panamanian descent
American people of Costa Rican descent
Dirty rap musicians
Interscope Records artists
Jive Records artists
Living people
People from Elmhurst, Queens
Rappers from New York City
Underground rappers
Zoo Entertainment (record label) artists
21st-century American rappers
21st-century American male musicians
American rappers of Panamanian descent
Year of birth missing (living people)